Ted or Teddy Owens may refer to:

Ted Owens (basketball) (born 1929), fifth head basketball coach of the Kansas Jayhawks
Ted Owens (ufology) (1920-1987), who claimed contact with a UFO
Teddy Owens, Gaelic footballer, trainer for Cork in 2007 All-Ireland Senior Football Championship Final 
Ted Owens (footballer) (1913–?), English association footballer (Crystal Palace and Preston North End)

See also
Edward Owens (disambiguation)
Edward Owen (disambiguation)